Dragonetti is a surname. Notable people with the surname include:
 Domenico Carlo Maria Dragonetti (1763 - 1846), an Italian double bass virtuoso
 Giacinto Dragonetti (1738–1818) Italian jurist and writer
 John Dragonetti, half of The Submarines, an American indie rock band
 Jessica Dragonette (1900-1980), American singer; born Jessica Valentina Dragonetti
 Leila Dragonette (1927–1979), American mathematician
 Ree Dragonette (1918-1979), American poet; born Rita Marie Dragonetti

See also 
 The Dragonetti Act, which regulates the torts of abuse of process and malicious prosecution in Pennsylvania
 Dragonetti, a part of Filiano
 Dragonetti: The Ruthless Contract Killer

Italian-language surnames